Dejan Mihevc  (born 14 May 1978) is a Slovenian basketball coach, currently serving as an assistant to Aleksander Sekulić at the Slovenian national team.

Honours
London Leopards
English Basketball League Division One: 2011–12
English National Cup (basketball): 2011–12

Tajfun Šentjur
Slovenian First League: 2014–15
Slovenian Basketball Supercup: 2015

Krka Novo mesto
Slovenian Basketball Supercup: 2016

Twarde Pierniki Toruń
Polish Basketball Cup: 2018
Polish Basketball Supercup: 2018
Polish Basketball League: Third place 2017–18, Runner-up 2018-19

Individual
English Basketball League Division One Best Coach: 2011-12
PLK Best Coach: 2017-18

References

External links 
 Athlenda profile

1978 births
Living people
Slovenian basketball coaches
Slovenian expatriate basketball people in Germany
KK Krka coaches